Saint-Vincent-sur-Jard (literally Saint-Vincent on Jard) is a commune in the Vendée department in the Pays de la Loire region in western France. Georges Clemenceau, French Prime Minister during World War I, would spend his remaining years here after retiring from political life in 1920, up until his death in 1929.

See also
Communes of the Vendée department

References

Communes of Vendée
Populated coastal places in France